Summer Heat is a 1968 Hong Kong film directed by the Japanese director Kō Nakahira (credited by his Chinese name Yeung Shu-Hei) and produced by Shaw Brothers Studio.

Plot
Judy, a seductive woman, has three men in her life, a husband, a playboy and an intellectual. Two of the men are brothers which leads to fatal consequences.

Cast 
 Jenny Hu - Judy	
 Chin Han - David Zhu
 Yang Fang - Zhu Xiao Chun
 Chin Feng - Peter Jiang
 Ma Siu-Ying - David's mother
 Woo Tung - David's father
 Wu Yen - Maid Huang
 Lee Sau-Kei - Judy's husband
 Chieh Yuen - Peter's buddy
 Siu Lam-Wun - Peter's buddy
 Law Hon - Peter's buddy
 King Pai-Chien - Gasoline station boss
 To Wing-Leung - Gasoline station worker
 Someno Yukio - Hunter Bowling Team member
 Yue Man-Wah - Club waiter
 Luk Chuen - Hunter Bowling Team member

References

External links
 
 
 Trailer with English subtitles

1968 films
Hong Kong drama films
Shaw Brothers Studio films